Robert Brooke Campbell Scarlett, 6th Baron Abinger (8 January 1876 – 10 June 1927) was a British peer.

Personal life and family
Scarlett was the second son of Lieutenant Colonel Leopold James Yorke Campbell Scarlett and Bessie Florence ( Gibson). In 1904, Scarlett, along with his siblings Hugh, Ruth, Percy, and Leopold, were authorised to use the style The Honourable by a Royal Warrant of Precedence. He succeeded his older brother Shelley as Baron Abinger in 1917.

Scarlett was a barrister of the Inner Temple and served in the Royal Navy.

In 1917, Lord Abinger married Marguerite Jeanne Steinheil (née Japy). Steinheil's claims to fame hitherto rested partly from having been obliquely described as present at the death of French President Félix Faure in 1899 and for having been acquitted of murdering her husband in 1909. They had no children, and the title of Baron Abinger passed to the 6th Baron's younger brother Hugh.

References

"Abinger, Baron (Scarlett) (Baron UK 1835)." Debrett's Peerage & Baronetage 1995. London: Debrett's Peerage Limited, 1995. pp. 8–9.

External links

1876 births
1927 deaths
Members of the Inner Temple
People educated at Wellington College, Berkshire
Royal Navy officers
Robert 6